Jim Baker is a former Northern Irish international lawn and indoor bowler.

Bowls career
Baker was born in Belfast on 18 February 1958. After finishing runner-up in the 1982 World Indoor Bowls Championship he went one better in 1984 clinching the World Indoor title.

Baker was part of the Gold Medal-winning triples for the combined Irish team in the 1984 World Outdoor Bowls Championship and Gold Medal-winning fours in the 1988 World Outdoor Bowls Championship.

In the 2004 World Championships he won a third gold medal for the combined Irish team, in the fours with Jonathan Ross, Noel Graham and Neil Booth and a silver medal with Noel Graham in the pairs during the 2004 World Outdoor Bowls Championship.

In addition Baker has won two Commonwealth Games medals.

At national level he also won the 1989 Irish National Bowls Championships singles.

References

Male lawn bowls players from Northern Ireland
1958 births
Living people
Sportspeople from Belfast
Commonwealth Games medallists in lawn bowls
Commonwealth Games silver medallists for Northern Ireland
Commonwealth Games bronze medallists for Northern Ireland
Bowls World Champions
Bowls players at the 1990 Commonwealth Games
Bowls players at the 2002 Commonwealth Games
Medallists at the 1990 Commonwealth Games
Medallists at the 2002 Commonwealth Games